Galanov is a masculine Russian surname, its feminine counterpart is Galanova. Notable people with the surname include:

Maxim Galanov (born 1974), Russian ice hockey player 

Russian-language surnames